Charbonnières-les-Bains is a commune in the Metropolis of Lyon in Auvergne-Rhône-Alpes region in eastern France. It borders Parc de Lacroix-Laval in Marcy-l'Étoile.

Population

References

Communes of Lyon Metropolis
Lyonnais